Tan Sui Hoon (born 5 December 1963) is a former Malaysian badminton player. Tan won a bronze medal at the 1991 Asian championship in Mixed doubles and a bronze in Asian cup competition. In 1992 she medalled in both the doubles competition in Asian championship. She won a total of seven medals at the Southeast Asian games, which constitute one in 1987 and three medals in 1989 and 1991 respectively. She represented Malaysia in 1990 Commonwealth games and contested bronze medal fight in Women's doubles event with her partner Lim Siew Choon, against Denyse Julien and Johanne Falardeau of Canada. They eventually lost 13–18, 2–15 and settled for fourth position. Tan represented her country twice in World championships in 1989 and 1991.

Achievements

Asian Championships 
Women's doubles

Mixed doubles

Asian Cup 
Mixed doubles

Southeast Asian Games 
Women's doubles

Mixed doubles

References

External links 

1963 births
Living people
20th-century Malaysian women
Malaysian sportspeople of Chinese descent
Malaysian female badminton players
Badminton players at the 1990 Commonwealth Games
Competitors at the 1987 Southeast Asian Games
Competitors at the 1989 Southeast Asian Games
Competitors at the 1991 Southeast Asian Games
Southeast Asian Games bronze medalists for Malaysia
Southeast Asian Games medalists in badminton
Commonwealth Games competitors for Malaysia